The 2008 Aktütün attack was a clash between the PKK (Kurdistan Workers' Party) and the Turkish Armed Forces which took place on 3 October 2008 at the Aktütün Police Station in the Şemdinli district of Hakkari.

The conflict took place at the 13th Gendarmerie Border Company Command, which is 4 kilometers from the Iraqi border and 40 kilometers from the Iranian border, this place is known by the locals as the Aktütün Police Station. 15 Turkish soldiers died when 200 to 400 PKK members opened fire at the Police Station with heavy weapons from northern Iraq. In the attack, in which 20 soldiers were injured, two of them seriously, 23 PKK members were also killed. During the conflict, two soldiers were reported missing and are thought to be dead.

Conflict 
The clash started around 14:00 when PKK members surrounded the station from three different hill areas and fired on the station, and continued until midnight. Various weapons, including anti-aircraft guns and different types of missiles were used by the PKK members in the attack. This attack was recorded by PKK members with three different cameras and later broadcast on various websites used by the organization for propaganda purposes. Before the attack, there are sections showing how the PKK members crossed the Turkish border to the region, the attack on the police station, and even how they crossed the Turkish border. In the evening hours, PKK members went closer to the police station and recorded different images there, and tried to infiltrate the police station with the aim of seizing the weapons and ammunition of the Turkish security forces in the police station. However, as a result of the intense fire and resistance of the Turkish security forces at the police station, the PKK members had to retreat.

Reactions and media 
On 8 October 2008, Taraf newspaper carried a news report claiming that the raid was reported sixteen days in advance of the actual conflict and that the Turkish Armed Forces did not take the necessary precautions. In the news, which also included satellite images, it was claimed that the Internal Security Operation status reports and instant intelligence information transmitted by unmanned aerial vehicles informed the General Staff of the Aktütün raid a month ago. Thereupon, the Military Court of General Staff imposed a broadcast ban on Taraf's news. Chief of General Staff İlker Başbuğ gave a very harsh statement by holding a press conference. "I urge everyone to be careful and be in the right place," he said in a statement to the press.

In the same evening, one of the three photographs revealed by the coordinates of the photographs, published in the main news bulletin of Kanal 1 and Star TV and by writing the coordinates of the photographs in the satellite observation program Google Earth, showed Aktütün and Bayraktepe. The party stood by its claims and stated that the region between 37 and 02-23 north parallel and 44-12-44 east meridians points to a point a little more than 1 kilometer away from Aktütün, and this can be understood when checked in Google Earth program. 1 denied the allegations.

A lawsuit was filed against Adnan Demir, the Editor-in-Chief of the Taraf newspaper, who was accused of "disclosure of prohibited information" belonging to the General Staff, with a demand for imprisonment between 3 and 5 years. Adnan Demir was acquitted of the case.

References 

Kurdistan Workers' Party attacks
Terrorist incidents in Turkey in 2008